Akurojin-no-hi (悪路神の火, "fire of the god of the bad road") is a ghostly flame from the folklore of Mie prefecture, Japan. It often appears on rainy nights. People who encounter it and do not run away become gravely ill.

See also
Will-o'-the-wisp

References

Japanese legendary creatures